Tetrameryx is an extinct genus of the North American artiodactyl family Antilocapridae, known from Mexico, the western United States, and Saskatchewan. The name means "four [horned] ruminant", referring to the division of each horn near its base into two prongs; in T. shuleri, the rear prong is much longer.

 
One member of the genus, T. shuleri, survived until about 12,000 years ago, and was present when Paleo-Indians reached North America. Although approximately the same size as the living pronghorn, the limb bones are somewhat more robust, suggesting that its running speed was slower than living pronghorn.

References

Prehistoric pronghorns
Prehistoric even-toed ungulate genera
Extinct mammals of North America
Taxa named by Richard Swann Lull
Fossil taxa described in 1921
Pleistocene mammals of North America